Norman Kent may refer to:

Norman A. Kent, skydiver, stunt man, and aerial cinematographer
Norm Kent, Norman Elliott Kent, American criminal defence attorney, publisher and radio talk show host
Norman Kent, a fictional character, gallant partner of Simon Templar in "The Last Hero (The Saint)"

See also
Kent Norman, American cognitive psychologist and an expert on Computer Rage